Alena Kiyevich (born 6 October 1987 in Brest) is a Belarusian sprinter. She competed in the 4 × 400 m relay event at the 2012 Summer Olympics.

References

Sportspeople from Brest, Belarus
Belarusian female sprinters
1987 births
Living people
Olympic athletes of Belarus
Athletes (track and field) at the 2012 Summer Olympics
Olympic female sprinters